John William Kendrick (October 14, 1853 – February 16, 1924) was chief engineer, general manager and vice-president of the Northern Pacific Railway and later vice-chairman of the board of the Atchison, Topeka and Santa Fe Railway.

Biography
He was born on October 14, 1853. He entered railway service in 1879 as levelman construction party in Yellowstone River Valley for the Northern Pacific Railroad, since which he has been consecutively 1879 to 1880, location work; 1880 to 1883, in charge of construction of 160 miles of Missouri and Yellowstone divisions; 1883 to 1888, chief engineer, St. Paul and Northern Pacific Railroad, in charge of main line and terminals between Brainerd, Minnesota and St. Paul, Minnesota; 1888 to July, 1893, chief engineer, Northern Pacific Railroad and leased lines; July, 1893, to February 1, 1899, general manager for receivers, same road and reorganized road, the Northern Pacific Railway; February 1, 1899 to date [1901], second vice-president.

From June 5, 1901, to October 4, 1905, Kendrick was third vice-president Atchison, Topeka and Santa Fe Railway, in charge of operation. From October 4, 1905, to June, 1911, he vice-president in charge of operation. From 1911 onwards he was a consulting railway expert.

John William Kendrick was later vice-chairman of the Atchison, Topeka and Santa Fe Railway. In the 1890s he formulated the engineering plans the reconstruction of the Northern Pacific Railway after its construction era, a period during which the Northern Pacific endured two receiverships and corporate reorganizations. At the dawn of the Twentieth Century he joined the Santa Fe, helping usher in an era of scientific management on that road. John William Kendrick played a vital and active role in the construction and formulation of business policies at two of the largest corporations in the American West.

He died on February 16, 1924.

References

Further reading
 Bryant, Keith L. Jr. History of the Atchison, Topeka and Santa Fe Railway. Lincoln [Neb.]: University of Nebraska Press, 1992, various.
 Busbey, T. Addison, editor. The Biographical Directory of the Railway Officials of America, 1901 edition. Chicago [Ill.]: Railway Age and Northwestern Railroader, 1901, p. 298.
 No author. Men of 1914: An Accurate Biographical Record of Prominent Men in All Walks of Life Who Have Achieved Success in Their Chosen Vocations in the Various Civil, Industrial, and Commercial Lines of Activity. Chicago: American Publishers' Association, 1915. Available on the Web at en.wikisource.org/wiki/Men_of_1914/K.
 WPI Journal. "People of the Century: Building Iron Rails." Worcester Polytechnic Institute: Spring, 1988. Available on the Web at: www.wpi.edu/News/Journal/Spring98/rails.html. Ironically, four of the five WPI civil engineering graduates listed in this article are early veterans of the Northern Pacific!

1853 births
1924 deaths
People from Worcester, Massachusetts
Northern Pacific Railway people
Atchison, Topeka and Santa Fe Railway people
American civil engineers
Worcester Polytechnic Institute alumni